Theodor "Turl" Wagner (6 August 1927 – 21 January 2020) was an Austrian footballer who played as a striker.

International career
He made his debut for Austria in a November 1946 friendly match against Switzerland and was a participant at the 1954 FIFA World Cup, where he scored a hat-trick in the 7–5 quarterfinal win over Switzerland. He earned 46 caps, scoring 22 goals. His last international was a March 1957 friendly match against West Germany. He was also part of Austria's squad for the football tournament at the 1948 Summer Olympics, but he did not play in any matches.

Death
Wagner died on 21 January 2020 in Vienna, at the age of 92.

References

External links

1927 births
2020 deaths
Austrian footballers
Austria international footballers
Olympic footballers of Austria
Footballers at the 1948 Summer Olympics
1954 FIFA World Cup players
FC Wacker Innsbruck players
Austrian football managers
FC Wacker Innsbruck managers
Association football forwards
Footballers from Vienna